Redbad or Radbod (died 719) was the king (or duke) of Frisia from c. 680 until his death. He is often considered the last independent ruler of Frisia before Frankish domination. He defeated Charles Martel at Cologne. Eventually, Charles prevailed and compelled the Frisians to submit. Redbad died in 719, but for some years his successors struggled against the Frankish power.

King or duke 
What the exact title of the Frisian rulers was depends on the source. Frankish sources tend to call them dukes; other sources often call them kings. Being Germanic pagans, it is likely that they would have been called kings by their followers, whereas the Christianized Franks would have referred to them as dukes.

Reign 
While his predecessor, Aldgisl, had welcomed Christianity into his realm, Redbad attempted to extirpate the religion and free the Frisians from subjugation to the Merovingian kingdom of the Franks. In 689, however, Redbad was defeated by Pepin of Herstal in the battle of Dorestad and compelled to cede Frisia Citerior (Nearer Frisia, from the Scheldt to the Vlie) to the Franks.

Between 690 and 692, Utrecht fell into the hands of Pepin. This gave the Franks control of important trade routes on the Rhine to the North Sea. Some sources say that, following this defeat, Redbad retreated, in 697, to the island of Heligoland. Others say he retreated to the part of the Netherlands that is still known as Friesland.

Around this time there was an Archbishopric or bishopric of the Frisians founded for Willibrord  and a marriage was held between Grimoald the Younger, the oldest son of Pepin, and Thiadsvind, the daughter of Redbad in 711.

On Pepin's death in 714, Redbad took the initiative again. He forced Saint Willibrord and his monks to flee and advanced as far as Cologne, where he defeated Charles Martel, Pepin's natural son, in 716. Eventually, however, Charles prevailed and compelled the Frisians to submit. Redbad died in 719, but for some years his successors struggled against the Frankish power.

As an example of how powerful King Redbad still was at the end of his life, the news that he was engaged in assembling an army was reportedly enough to fill the Frankish kingdom with fear and trembling.

Relation with the Roman Catholic Church 
During the second journey of Saint Boniface to Rome, Wulfram (or Vulfran), a monk and ex-archbishop of Sens tried to convert Redbad, but after an unsuccessful attempt he returned to Fontenelle. It is said that Redbad was nearly baptised but refused when he was told that he would not be able to find any of his ancestors in Heaven after his death. He said he preferred spending eternity in Hell with his pagan ancestors than in Heaven with a pack of beggars. This legend is also told with Wulfram being replaced with bishop Willibrord.

Legacy 

Saint Radboud was a descendant of Redbad.  Saint Radboud was a bishop of Utrecht who adopted his ancestor's native name. The Nijmegen University and its corresponding medical facility were named after him in 2004.

In Richard Wagner's Lohengrin a certain "Radbod, ruler of the Frisians" is mentioned as Ortrud's ancestor.

In Harry Harrison's The Hammer and the Cross series of novels, Redbad becomes the founder of "the Way", an organized pagan cult, created to combat the efforts of Christian missionaries.

Black metal band Ophidian Forest recorded a concept album Redbad in 2007.

Dutch folk metal band 'Heidevolk' recorded a song 'Koning Radboud' (King Redbad) on their 2008 album 'Walhalla Wacht' singing about the legend of Wulfram and Redbad.

In 2015 the Frisian Folk-Metal band Baldrs Draumar released a full album on the life and deeds of king Redbad called Aldgillessoan. It is based on the book Rêdbâd, Kronyk fan in Kening (Chronicles of a King) by Willem Schoorstra.

In 2018, Dutch production company Farmhouse released a film, Redbad, based on the historical Redbad. It is directed by Roel Reiné and stars Jonathan Banks and Søren Malling alongside a variety of Dutch actors.

See also 
 Frisian–Frankish wars
 Low Countries mythology

References

Other sources 
 
 Petz, G. H. (ed). MGH Scriptures. (Hanover, 1892).

External links 

719 deaths
7th-century monarchs in Europe
8th-century monarchs in Europe
Germanic pagans
Medieval Frisian rulers
Year of birth unknown